The JGR Class 3900 was a type of  steam locomotive used on Japanese Government Railways. The locomotives were imported from Germany for the Abt rack system railway built in Karuizawa, Nagano.

See also
 Japan Railways locomotive numbering and classification

References

0-6-0T locomotives
Steam locomotives of Japan
1067 mm gauge locomotives of Japan
Scrapped locomotives